Zhang Rong (born February 1964, in Huai'an) is a Chinese physicist who has worked in the area of wide band‐gap semiconductor materials and devices. He has been serving as president of Shandong University since October 2013. Zhang Rong joined the Department of Physics, Nanjing University as a student in September 1979 and became a member of the faculty there in July 1986 and was promoted to professor in March 1995. During the period from 1995 to 1999, he was a visiting scientist at the University of Wisconsin–Madison and the University of Maryland. He received a named professorship (“Cheung Kong Scholar's Program”) from the Ministry of Education in 2000. He became assistant to the president of Nanjing University in February 2002, was appointed to the standing committee of the university as a vice president in November 2006. In April 2010, he was reappointed to the standing committee and promoted to Executive Vice President of Nanjing University. In October 2013, he became president of Shandong University (at a rank equivalent to a vice-minister).

References

1964 births
Educators from Huai'an
Presidents of Shandong University
Living people
Scientists from Huai'an
Nanjing University alumni
University of Wisconsin–Madison fellows
Academic staff of Nanjing University
Physicists from Jiangsu